Popzilla is an American adult animated sketch comedy television series that aired on MTV. It premiered on September 27, 2009 following America's Best Dance Crew and ended on October 16 of the same year. The show is produced by SCTV alum Dave Thomas and is an animated sketch comedy show focused on pop culture, celebrities, and famous figures. Each episode consists of about 30 sketches, each under a minute. Celebrities such as Britney Spears, K-Fed, Criss Angel and even fictional characters such as Harry Potter have all been targets in some of the early sketches released on YouTube.

Popzilla is animated in Flash by Animax Entertainment in order to provide for fast turnaround to cover celebrity news.

See also 
Robot Chicken
Like, Share, Die
Mad (TV series)

References 

2009 American television series debuts
2009 American television series endings
2000s American adult animated television series
2000s American sketch comedy television series
American adult animated comedy television series
American flash adult animated television series
English-language television shows
MTV cartoons
MTV original programming
American television series with live action and animation